Enlighten Thy Daughter is a 1917 American silent drama film directed and written by Ivan Abramson.

Plot
The exploitation/sexual hygiene film warns against the dangers of premarital sex. Lillian Stevens (played by Zena Keefe) is young woman who ends up having sex with Harold Winthrop (played by James W. Morrison) after both are caught in an unexpected storm during a date. Of course, she gets pregnant. Mom does not realize Lillian has been out all night due to her own gambling addiction. The same young man later starts dating Lillian's cousin Ruth (played by Rubye De Remer). They get engaged, but Lillian's pregnancy—and the identity of the father—is revealed when she dies from an illegal abortion, and Ruth breaks off the engagement.

Cast
   
Frank Sheridan as Daniel Stevens
Katharine Kaelred as Mrs. Daniel Stevens
Zena Keefe as Lillian Stevens
Arthur Donaldson as Richard Stevens
Marie Shotwell as Minna Stevens
Rubye De Remer as Ruth Stevens (credited as Ruby De Remer)
James W. Morrison as Harold Winthrop
Violet Horner as Mrs. Laurence
Runa Hodges as Nina
Walter Gould as Walter
Mathilde Brundage as Mrs. Winthrop

Reception
The New York Times was critical of the film, calling it an "inept and melodramatic variant of the theme of the danger that lurks in the failure to apprise the young of dangers by which they are beset."  Other reviews were not as unkind, however, calling it a "remarkable drama, tense and thrilling," and agreeing with the movie's advertising claim to be "the most tremendous moral force the screen has ever known."

The movie was a box office success, and has been described as director Abramson's biggest hit.

A remake of the same title was released in 1934 (the only Abramson film ever remade).

References

External links

1917 films
American black-and-white films
American silent feature films
American exploitation films
Films directed by Ivan Abramson
1910s exploitation films
Silent American drama films
1917 drama films
1910s American films